Brafield-on-the-Green is a civil parish and small village in West Northamptonshire.

The villages name means 'Hill-top open country'.

Location

A section of Brafield sits within a conservation area.

Brafield Stadium
Brafield Stadium known as Northampton International Raceway hosts BriSCA Formula 1 Stock Cars. As early as 1949, local entrepreneurs staged midget car racing at the stadium, as part of a national attempt to introduce the sport from the US. It also hosted speedway.  The team known as the Flying Foxes took part in the Southern Area League in 1954. The team was renamed the Brafield Badgers and interspersed individual meetings with matches against reserve sides from British League tracks. The Speedway closed for good at the end of the 1967 season.

References

External links
 Official village website

Villages in Northamptonshire
West Northamptonshire District
Civil parishes in Northamptonshire